The Memnonia quadrangle is one of a series of 30 quadrangle maps of Mars used by the United States Geological Survey (USGS) Astrogeology Research Program. The Memnonia quadrangle is also referred to as MC-16 (Mars Chart-16).

The quadrangle is a region of Mars that covers latitude -30° to 0° and longitude 135° to 180°.  The western part of Memnonia is a highly cratered highland region that exhibits a large range of crater degradation.

Memnonia includes these topographical regions of Mars:
 Arcadia Planitia
 Amazonis Planitia
 Lucus Planum
 Terra Sirenum
 Daedalia Planum
 Terra Cimmeria

Recently, evidence of water was found in the area.  Layered sedimentary rocks were found in the wall and floor of Columbus Crater.  These rocks could have been deposited by water or by wind.  Hydrated minerals were found in some of the layers, so water may have been involved.

Many ancient river valleys including Mangala Vallis, have been found in the Memnonia quadrangle.  Mangala appears to have begun with the formation of a graben, a set of faults that may have exposed an aquifer. Dark slope streaks and troughts (fossae) are present in this quadrangle.  Part of the Medusae Fossae Formation is found in the Memnonia quadrangle.

Layers 
Columbus Crater contains layers, also called strata.  Many places on Mars show rocks arranged in layers.  Sometimes the layers are of different colors.  Light-toned rocks on Mars have been associated with hydrated minerals like sulfates.  The Mars rover Opportunity examined such layers close-up with several instruments.  Some layers are probably made up of fine particles because they seem to break up into fine dust.  Other layers break up into large boulders so they are probably much harder. Basalt, a volcanic rock, is thought to in the layers that form boulders.  Basalt has been identified on Mars in many places.  Instruments on orbiting spacecraft have detected clay (also called phyllosilicate) in some layers.  Recent research with an orbiting near-infrared spectrometer, which reveals the types of minerals present based on the wavelengths of light they absorb, found evidence of layers of both clay and sulfates in Columbus crater.  This is exactly what would appear if a large lake had slowly evaporated.   Moreover, because some layers contained gypsum, a sulfate which forms in relatively fresh water, life could have formed in the crater.

Scientists are excited about finding hydrated minerals such as sulfates and clays on Mars because they are usually formed in the presence of water.  Places that contain clays and/or other hydrated minerals would be good places to look for evidence of life.

Rock can form layers in a variety of ways.  Volcanoes, wind, or water can produce layers.

Mangala Vallis
Mangala Vallis is a major channel system that contains several basins which filled, then the overflow went through a series of spillways. One source of waters for the system was Memonia Fossae, but water also probably came from a large basin centered at 40 degrees S.

Craters
Impact craters generally have a rim with ejecta around them, in contrast volcanic craters usually do not have a rim or ejecta deposits.  As craters get larger (greater than 10 km in diameter) they usually have a central peak. The peak is caused by a rebound of the crater floor following the impact.  Sometimes craters will display layers.  Since the collision that produces a crater is like a powerful explosion, rocks from deep underground are tossed unto the surface.  Hence, craters can show us what lies deep under the surface.  At times, bright rays surround craters because the impact has gone down to a bright layer of rocks, then thrown out the bright rocks on the darker surface.  An image below from Mars Global Surveyor shows this.

Ridges
Ridges on Mars may be due to different causes.  Long straight ridges are thought to be dikes.  Curved and branched ridges may be examples of inverted topography, and groups of straight ridges that cross each other may be the result of impacts.  These intersecting box-like ridges are called linear ridge networks.
Linear ridge networks are found in various places on Mars in and around craters.   Ridges often appear as mostly straight segments that intersect in a lattice-like manner.  They are hundreds of meters long, tens of meters high, and several meters wide.  It is thought that impacts created fractures in the surface, these fractures later acted as channels for fluids.  Fluids cemented the structures.  With the passage of time, surrounding material was eroded away, thereby leaving hard ridges behind.

Yardangs

Yardangs are common in some regions on Mars, especially in what's called the "Medusae Fossae Formation."  They are formed by the action of wind on sand sized particles; hence they often point in the direction that the winds were blowing when they were formed.
 ,

Dark slope streaks 
Many places on Mars show dark slope streaks on steep slopes like crater walls.  It seems that the youngest streaks are dark; they become lighter with age.  Often they begin as a small narrow spot then widen and extend downhill for hundreds of meters.  Several ideas have been advanced to explain the streaks. Some involve water. or even the growth of organisms.  The streaks appear in areas covered with dust.  Much of the Martian surface is covered with dust. Fine dust settles out of the atmosphere covering everything.  We know a lot about this dust because the solar panels of Mars Rovers get covered with dust.  The power of the Rovers has been saved many times by the wind, in the form of dust devils, that have cleared the panels and boosted the power.  From these observations with the Rovers, we know that the process of dust coming out of the atmosphere then returning happens over and over.

It is most generally accepted that the streaks represent avalanches of dust.   The streaks appear in areas covered with dust.  When a thin layer of dust is removed, the underlying surface is dark.  Much of the Martian surface is covered with dust.  Dust storms are frequent, especially when the spring season begins in the southern hemisphere.  At that time, Mars is 40% closer to the sun.  The orbit of Mars is much more elliptical then the Earth's.  That is the difference between the farthest point from the sun and the closest point to the sun is very great for Mars, but only slight for the Earth.  Also, every few years, the entire planet is engulfed in a global dust storm.  When NASA's Mariner 9 craft arrived there, nothing could be seen through the dust storm. Other global dust storms have also been observed, since that time.  Dark streaks can be seen in the image below taken with HiRISE of the central mound in Nicholson Crater.  At least one streak in the image splits into two when encountering an obstacle.

Research, published in January 2012 in Icarus, found that dark streaks were initiated by airblasts from meteorites traveling at supersonic speeds. The team of scientists was led by Kaylan Burleigh, an undergraduate at the University of Arizona.  After counting some 65,000 dark streaks around the impact site of a group of 5 new craters, patterns emerged.  The number of streaks was greatest closer to the impact site.  So, the impact somehow probably caused the streaks. Also, the distribution of the streaks formed a pattern with two wings extending from the impact site.  The curved wings resembled scimitars, curved knives.  This pattern suggests that an interaction of airblasts from the group of meteorites shook dust loose enough to start dust avalanches that formed the many dark streaks.  At first it was thought that the shaking of the ground from the impact caused the dust avalanches, but if that was the case the dark streaks would have been arranged symmetrically around the impacts, rather than being concentrated into curved shapes.

Fossa on Mars
Large troughs (long narrow depressions) are called fossae in the geographical language used for Mars.  This term is derived from Latin; therefore fossa is singular and fossae is plural. Troughs form when the crust is stretched until it breaks.  The stretching can be due to the large weight of a nearby volcano.  A trough often has two breaks with a middle section moving down, leaving steep cliffs along the sides; such a trough is called a graben. Lake George, in northern New York State, is a lake that sits in a graben.

Other ideas have been suggested for the formation of fossae.  There is evidence that they are associated with dikes of magma.  Magma might move along, under the surface, breaking the rock and more importantly melting ice.  The resulting action would cause a crack to form at the surface.  Dikes caused both by tectonic stretching (extension) and by dikes are found in Iceland.  An example of a graben caused by a dike is shown below in the image Memnonia Fossae, as seen by HiRISE.

It appears that the water started coming out of the surface to form Mangala Vallis when a graben was formed.

Valles 
There is enormous evidence that water once flowed in river valleys on Mars.  Images of curved channels have been seen in images from Mars spacecraft dating back to the early seventies with the Mariner 9 orbiter. 
Vallis (plural valles) is the Latin word for valley. It is used in planetary geology for the naming of landform features on other planets, including what could be old river valleys that were discovered on Mars, when probes were first sent to Mars.  The Viking Orbiters caused a revolution in our ideas about water on Mars; huge river valleys were found in many areas.  Space craft cameras showed that floods of water broke through dams, carved deep valleys, eroded grooves into bedrock, and traveled thousands of kilometers.  Some valles on Mars (Mangala Vallis, Athabasca Vallis, Granicus Vallis, and Tinjar Valles) clearly begin at graben.  On the other hand, some of the large outflow channels begin in rubble-filled low areas called chaos or chaotic terrain.  It has been suggested that massive amounts of water were trapped under pressure beneath a thick cryosphere (layer of frozen ground), then the water was suddenly released, perhaps when the cryosphere was broken by a fault.

Lava flows
Lava is common on Mars, as it is on many other planetary bodies.

Fifty Years of Mars Imaging: from Mariner 4 to HiRISE

On October 3, 2017, HiRISE acquired a picture of Mars in the Memnonia quadrangle of a spot that has been imaged by 7 different cameras on different spacecraft over the past 50 years.  The pictures from the Red Planet started with one of the pictures from Mariner 4 in the summer of 1965.  The following pictures show these pictures with their increasing resolution over the years.  The resolution in the first image by Mariner 4 was 1.25 km/pixel; that compares to the approximate 50 cm/pixel resolution of HiRISE.

More features of Memnonia quadrangle

Other Mars quadrangles

Interactive Mars map

See also

 Climate of Mars
 Dark slope streaks 
 Fossa (geology)
 Geology of Mars
 Groundwater on Mars
 HiRISE
 High Resolution Stereo Camera - HRSC
 HiWish program
 Impact crater
 Lakes on Mars
 List of quadrangles on Mars
 Linear ridge networks
 Lucus Planum
 Mariner 4
 Mars Express
 Mars Global Surveyor
 Mars Orbiter Camera
 Mars Orbiter Mission
 2001 Mars Odyssey
 MAVEN
 Thermal Emission Imaging System- THEMIS
 Viking program
 Vallis
 Valley networks (Mars)
 Water on Mars
 Yardang
 Yardangs on Mars

References

External links

 Lpi.usra.edu
 Ralphaeschliman.com
 Uapress.arizona.edu

 
Mars